Emerald Aether: Shape Shifting is a remix album by American composer Bill Laswell, released on March 14, 2000 by Shanachie Records.

Track listing

Personnel 
Adapted from the Emerald Aether: Shape Shifting liner notes.
Michael Fossenkemper – mastering
James Koehnline – cover art
Bill Laswell – producer, mixing
Robert Musso – engineering

Release history

References

External links 
 Emerald Aether: Shape Shifting at Bandcamp
 

2000 remix albums
Bill Laswell remix albums
Albums produced by Bill Laswell
Shanachie Records remix albums